The Men's slalom competition at the FIS Alpine World Ski Championships 1931 was held on 21 February.

Results

References

Men's slalom